Alcyna ocellata is a species of sea snail, a marine gastropod mollusk in the family Trochidae, the top snails.

Description
The shell grows to a length of 2 mm. The shell is smooth and imperforate. The whorls are slightly convex. They are pale crimson, the last encircled by ocellated spots. The columella terminates in a prominent acute denticle. The operculum is non-calcareous.

Distribution
This marine shell occurs off Japan, New Caledonia and Hawaii.

References

 Robertson, R. 1985. Archaeogastropod biology and the systematics of the genus Tricolia (Trochacea: Tricoliidae) in the Indo-West Pacific. Monographs of Marine Mollusca 3: 1-103 page(s): 20

External links
 To Biodiversity Heritage Library (10 publications)
 To GenBank (10 nucleotides; 3 proteins)
 To World Register of Marine Species
 

ocellata
Gastropods described in 1860